Vejen Municipality is a municipality (Danish, kommune) in Region of Southern Denmark on the Jutland peninsula in south Denmark.  The municipality covers an area of 817 km2, and has a total population of 42,596 (2022).  Its mayor is Egon Fræhr, a member of the Venstre (Liberal Party) political party.

The municipality is part of Triangle Region and of the East Jutland metropolitan area, which had a total population of 1.378 million in 2016.

The main town and the site of its municipal council is the town of Vejen. One of the attractions of the area is the Vejen Art Museum.

History
On January 1, 2007, Vejen municipality was, as the result of Kommunalreformen ("The Municipal Reform" of 2007), merged with Brørup, Holsted, and Rødding municipalities to form an enlarged Vejen municipality.

Locations in Vejen Municipality

Politics
Vejen's municipal council consists of 27 members, elected every four years. The municipal council has seven political committees.

Municipal council
Below are the municipal councils elected since the Municipal Reform of 2007.

References

Sources
 Municipal statistics: NetBorger Kommunefakta, delivered from KMD aka Kommunedata (Municipal Data)
 Municipal mergers and neighbors: Eniro new municipalities map

External links 

 
 Vejen Art Museum

 
Municipalities of the Region of Southern Denmark
Municipalities of Denmark
Populated places established in 2007